Bowriefauld is a village in Angus, Scotland.

Villages in Angus, Scotland